The National Research Institute of Electronics and Cryptology of Turkey, shortly UEKAE, is a national scientific organization with the aim of developing advanced technologies for information security. UEKAE is the most prominent and also the founder (first) institute of the TÜBİTAK.

The institute was founded by Yılmaz Tokad, professor at ITU (Istanbul Technical University), and four researchers under his supervision in the building of engineering at METU (Middle East Technical University)in 1972, with the name Electronic Research Unit. In 1995 the institute's name has become National Research Institute of Electronics and Cryptology and moved to Gebze, Kocaeli.

It is affiliated with the TÜBİTAK Informatics and Information Security Research Center (BİLGEM), which is bound to Scientific and Technological Research Council of Turkey (TUBİTAK). The institute was later reorganized as the prime institute of the BİLGEM in the Gebze, Kocaeli Province campus of TÜBİTAK.

The institute consists of facilities on fields and for products as follows:
 Semiconductor Technologies Research Laboratory (YITAL)
 Cryptanalysis Center
 EMC/Tempest Test Center
 Speech and Language Technologies
 Software Development
 Surveillance Systems
 Communication and Information Security
 Electro-Optics Laboratory
 Spectrum Analysis and Management
 Open Source Software
 Government Cerficiation Authority (KSM)
 NATO Certified Products

See also
TÜBİTAK Informatics and Information Security Research Center  (TÜBİTAK BİLGEM)
Scientific and Technological Research Council of Turkey (TÜBİTAK)
Turkish Academy of Sciences (TÜBA)
Turkish Atomic Energy Authority (TAEK)
 Pardus, a Linux distribution

References

External links
 Official website of the institute 

Research institutes in Turkey
Defence companies of Turkey
Scientific and Technological Research Council of Turkey
Organizations established in 1994
1994 establishments in Turkey
Organizations based in Gebze